Danielle Kathleen Savre (born August 26, 1988) is an American actress and singer. She is known for her television roles, such as her lead performances in the 2007 MTV music drama Kaya, the 2016 TLC drama Too Close to Home, and the ABC Grey's Anatomy spinoff Station 19, and for her roles in the films Wild About Harry and Boogeyman 2. She was born in Simi Valley, California.

Career

Acting
In 2006 Savre was cast in the straight-to-DVD film Bring It On: All or Nothing. In 2007 she was cast the 2009 drama film Wild About Harry (originally titled American Primitive) playing the part of Madeline, a 1970s teenager who comes to realize that her father is gay. The same year Savre was cast as the titular rock star character on the MTV series Kaya which ran for one season. She also starred in the 2007 horror film Boogeyman 2 playing the lead role of Laura Potter.

Savre has made guest appearances in several television shows like The X-Files, CSI: Crime Scene Investigation and Charmed. She had recurring roles in the television show Summerland as Callie, and the NBC series Heroes as Jackie Wilcox. However, in Heroes, her character is killed in the ninth episode "Homecoming" of the first season, though she reappears thrice more: once retrospectively in "Six Months Ago", and twice during the fourth season, in "Once Upon a Time in Texas" and "Pass/Fail".

In 2014, Savre was cast as the cheating wife in the 2015 thriller film Adulterers (also known as Avouterie). The same year she was cast as "Margo, the acting head of the leading shapeshifting family" in the Supernatural spinoff series Supernatural: Bloodlines which ultimately was not ordered to series.  In 2016, Savre was cast as lead character Anna in the Tyler Perry drama series Too Close to Home.

In 2018, Savre was cast as a main character, the bisexual firefighter Maya Bishop, on the Grey's Anatomy spinoff drama series, Station 19.

Singing
In her teens, Savre was a part of music groups, Sweet Obsession and Trinity. Savre was professionally choreographed by choreographer Shane Sparks during both her group's performances and during her solo singing career. In addition, Savre sang during her 2007 role as Kaya in the MTV music drama Kaya.

Filmography

Film

Television

References

External links

 

1988 births
Actresses from California
American television actresses
American child actresses
Living people
People from Simi Valley, California
21st-century American actresses
21st-century American singers
American film actresses
Singers from California
21st-century American women singers